Julia Reinprecht (born July 12, 1991) is an American field hockey player, who plays in defence. At the 2012 and 2016 Summer Olympics, she competed for the United States women's national field hockey team in the women's event. She was also part of the US teams that won gold at the 2011 and 2015 Pan American Games.  She retired from the US team in 2016.

Biography
She was born in Philadelphia, and attended Princeton University.  In her last college game, Reinprecht broke her skull.  Her sister Katie has also represented the USA in field hockey and attended Princeton.  They announced their retirement together.

See also
 List of Princeton University Olympians

References

External links
 

1991 births
Living people
American female field hockey players
Olympic field hockey players of the United States
Field hockey players at the 2012 Summer Olympics
Field hockey players at the 2016 Summer Olympics
Field hockey players at the 2011 Pan American Games
Princeton Tigers field hockey players
Pan American Games gold medalists for the United States
Pan American Games medalists in field hockey
Medalists at the 2011 Pan American Games

Field hockey players at the 2015 Pan American Games
People from Philadelphia